Sant Joan de Vilatorrada is a municipality in the comarca of the Bages in Catalonia, Spain.

The town of Sant Joan de Vilatorrada is located at 3 km. from Manresa, the capital of the Bages comarca (county). The municipal limits are: in the North Sant Mateu de Bages and Callús, in the Northeast Santpedor; in the East Sant Fruitós de Bages, in the South-east Manresa and in the West Fonollosa.

Notable people
 
 
The Missing Leech, (real name Maurici Ribera), anti folk musician

References

External links
Official site 
 Government data pages 

Municipalities in Bages